The Guam Cycling Federation or GCF is the national governing body of cycle racing in Guam.

The GCF is a member of the UCI and the OCC.

References

External links
 Guam Cycling Federation official website

National members of the Oceania Cycling Confederation
Cycle racing organizations
Cycle racing in Guam
Cycling